Maglič is a 13th-century castle about  south of Kraljevo, Serbia. The fortress protected the only road that connected the Great Morava Valley and Kosovo polje. Its name means 'the foggy one' .

Maglič was included on the list of Cultural Monuments of Exceptional Importance in 1979.

History
Maglič was built in the first half of 13th century, by either Stefan the First-Crowned, or his son Uroš I. It was built to safeguard two important monasteries, Sopoćani and Studenica, as well as prevent any future Mongolian raid deeper into the Serbian lands. In Serbian empire, Maglič was the seat of Archbishop Danilo II, who wrote his famous hagiographies and regiographies residing there.

After capturing Smederevo on June 20, 1459, the Ottoman Empire occupied Maglič and held it until its recapture by Serbs during the Great Turkish War. After the defeat of the Serbian uprising the Ottoman Turks retook the fortress, abandoning it soon after.

During the Second Serbian Uprising, Voivod Radoslav Jelečanin ambushed a group of Turkish soldiers at Maglič and halted their advance from Novi Pazar.

Architecture

The fortress consist of seven towers and one dungeon tower connected with walls. The towers are typical for a medieval fortress in the Balkan peninsula with three solid sides and wooden fences on inner side. Maglič has one gate placed in the north, and one small sally port in one of the towers in the southeast part. Inside the fortress are remains of a palace, barracks, and a church of Saint George. There is also a large reservoir for water and a well. In the southern part of the fortress, three towers are placed next to each other to give better protection from attacks.

Present state
The fortress was partly restored after World War I, but main restoration of it took place in late 1980. During that restoration wooden floors in its towers and fences along the walls were restored. Today they are a potential danger because some of them are rotten.

Every year the bottom of the Maglič is the starting point of for the "Merry Ride", a popular voyage down the Ibar River to Kraljevo. All types of river-worthy vessels are used during it, and politicians often join the festivities. Usually more than 3,000 vessels take part in this whole day voyage.

It was announced in 2010 that Maglič would undergo restoration with local donations and financial backing from Italy.

See also

Zvečan Fortress
Golubac Fortress
List of fortifications in Serbia
Cultural Monuments of Exceptional Importance
Tourism in Serbia

References and Bibliography

Cultural Monuments of Exceptional Importance (Serbia)
Medieval Serbian architecture
Forts in Serbia
Ruins in Serbia